Black Water is the third mixtape by American recording artist Tinashe, first released on November 26, 2013 via INgrooves and her official website. The mixtape was released after the release of her second mixtape Reverie and also being signed to RCA prior to releasing the mixtape.

As executive producer, Tinashe enlisted a variety of musical producers to work with her on the mixtape, including Boi-1da, Best Kept Secret, Dev Hynes, Frank Dukes, Gabriel Lambrith, !llmind, Inc, J. Oliver, K-BeatZ, Karon Graham, Misfitz Sounds, Osinachi, Ryan Hemsworth, Vinylz, besides being executive producer of the mixtape Tinashe also wrote all of the mixtapes songs. Musically, Black Water doesn't stray far from the same PBR&B and alternative hip hop sound that In Case We Die included, the mixtape also touches on several new genres such as electronica and neo soul.

The mixtape was preceded by the release of the lead single "Vulnerable" which was released on November 20, 2013.

Black Water received positive reviews from music critics who stated she "has the most promising voices of the new generation of alt-R&B starlets," with some critics calling it "highly anticipated" and "must listen" and praised Tinashe's vocal growth. Other critics compared the mixtape to that of Janet Jackson, TLC and Aaliyah.

Background
After a four-year stint in the pop-dance girl group the Stunners, Tinashe left the group to pursue a solo career. On December 20, 2011, Tinashe announced that she would be releasing a mixtape entitled In Case We Die in 2012. After four singles and reaching over one million digital downloads, Tinashe was signed to RCA Records with her official debut album to be released sometime in 2013.
On August 5, 2012 Tinashe announced that she was ready to release her second project, titled Reverie. After uploading a trailer of the mixtape on her YouTube channel, it was confirmed that the name of the mixtape is Reverie. The official cover was revealed via Instagram on August 13, 2012. On September 1, 2012 she wrote to her followers on Twitter that Reverie will be released on September 6, 2012.

Development
For the recording of the mixtape Black Water was self-composed and recorded and engineered entirely in Tinashe's bedroom, much like her previous work. For Reverie, Tinashe was the executive producer, however she did also work with various producers from her first project, In Case We Die such as K-BeatZ, Wes Tarte and B. Hendrixx as well as working with new producers BMarz, Nez & Rio, Best Kept Secret, Troobadore, Roc & Mayne, JRB The Producer, and xxyyxx.

Tinashe explained in an interview the meaning behind the mixtape Black Water :

Critical reception
Reviews for Black Water were generally positive reviews, with the comments on popular mixtape site DatPiff being positive, as well as receiving promotional space on the main page of DatPiff, and peaking at number five on the most downloaded chart on its first day of release and drawing comparisons to Aaliyah and Mýa via fans on social networking site Twitter.

MuuMuse.com commented on her growth in this mixtape since her past mixtapes saying "like her past two free offerings 2012′s In Case We Die and Reverie — Black Water plays host to plenty of sensual vocals, downtempo beats and murky, The Weeknd-leaning mood music for your listening enjoyment past the midnight hour."

Fact Magazine criticized her vocals falling flat at times saying "The biggest knock on Tinashe has been a voice that often falters at higher registers and tends to get too breathy: that problem is particularly noticeable on the Inc.-produced ‘Middle of Nowhere’, and she's practically whispering on closer ‘Ain’t Ready’. Yet, when she balances the breathiness with something more concrete, it pays off. She explores her full range on ‘Black Water’, knowing when to give a light touch to a melody reminiscent of 90s R&B."

Track listing
Credits adapted from ASCAP and BMI.

Sampling credits
 "Vulnerable" samples "On Sight" and "I'm In It" performed by Kanye West
 "Stunt" samples "Cop Blood" by Frank Dukes
 "Just a Taste" samples "Anniversary" performed by Tony! Toni! Toné!.

Release history

References

External links
Tinashe's Official Website

2013 mixtape albums
Albums produced by Best Kept Secret (production team)
Tinashe albums
Albums produced by Frank Dukes
Albums produced by Dev Hynes
Albums produced by Boi-1da
Albums produced by Vinylz
Albums produced by Illmind